The following is a list of major and notable scholarly journals in international business. The list is not comprehensive, as there are many other journals that are published. The list contains most of the prominent journals in the field. 

 Corporate Governance: An International Review
 Cross-Cultural Research
 European Journal of International Management
 Global Strategy Journal
 Journal of International Business Studies
 Journal of International Economics
 Journal of International Management
 Management International Review

Journals

International Business Journals